The Terra Australis Orogen (TAO) was the oceanic southern margin of Gondwana which stretched from South America to Eastern Australia and encompassed South Africa, West Antarctica, New Zealand and Victoria Land in East Antarctica.

Origins 
Terra Australis Orogen formed in the Neoproterozoic and Paleozoic. The decline of orogenic activity in the late Paleozoic is related to the assembly of the supercontinent Pangea. The orogeny did not end by a continental collision and was succeeded by the Gondwanide orogeny.

The TAO evolved through a series of extensional back-arcs separated by compressional events when the subducting oceanic plate got stuck in Gondwana's margin.

As Gondwana was amalgamated in the Early Palaeozoic during the so-called Pan-African orogenies the TAO propagated along the southern (modern coordinates) Proto-Pacific/Iapetus margin of the supercontinent.  The TAO ended   with the Gondwanide orogeny.  This and younger orogens covers most of the outboard margin of the TAO, and, likewise, the inboard margin is almost entirely covered by younger deposits and ice but remains exposed in Australia along the Torrens Hinge Line or Delamarian orogeny.  One end of the TAO was a series of terranes (Avalonia–Carolina–Cadomia) which were rifted off the western margin of Gondwana and added to Laurentia in the Late Palaeozoic, while its other end probably reached past Australia into New Guinea.

In 1937 Alexander du Toit proposed the Samfrau Orogeny as an evidence for Gondwana.  His concept includes the orogenies of West Gondwana and orogenies that are now considered separate events but excludes those of East Gondwana.

See also
 Terra Australis

References
 Notes

 Sources

 
 
 

Orogenies of Africa
Orogenies of Antarctica
Orogenies of Australia
Orogenies of New Zealand
Orogenies of South America
Cambrian orogenies
Geology of Antarctica
Geology of Argentina
Geology of Australia
Geology of Chile
Geology of South Africa
Devonian orogenies
Ediacaran orogenies
Neoproterozoic orogenies
Silurian orogenies
Ordovician orogenies